The canton of Saverne is an administrative division of the Bas-Rhin department, northeastern France. Its borders were modified at the French canton reorganisation which came into effect in March 2015. Its seat is in Saverne.

It consists of the following communes:

Altenheim
Balbronn
Cosswiller
Crastatt
Dettwiller
Dimbsthal
Eckartswiller
Ernolsheim-lès-Saverne
Friedolsheim
Furchhausen
Gottenhouse
Gottesheim
Haegen
Hattmatt
Hengwiller
Hohengœft
Jetterswiller
Kleingœft
Knœrsheim
Landersheim
Littenheim
Lochwiller
Lupstein
Maennolsheim
Marmoutier
Monswiller
Ottersthal
Otterswiller
Printzheim
Rangen
Reinhardsmunster
Reutenbourg
Romanswiller
Saessolsheim
Saint-Jean-Saverne
Saverne
Schwenheim
Sommerau
Steinbourg
Thal-Marmoutier
Traenheim
Waldolwisheim
Wangenbourg-Engenthal
Wasselonne
Westhoffen
Westhouse-Marmoutier
Wolschheim
Zehnacker
Zeinheim

References

Cantons of Bas-Rhin